Brig. Gen. Khaya Makina (6 June 1964 – 25 March 2021) was a General Officer in the South African Army from the artillery. He was born in New Brighton location in Port Elizabeth on 6 June 1964. He matriculated from Khwezi Lomso High School in 1982. He joined the uMkhonto we Sizwe and went into exile in the Kingdom of Lesotho and later in the Republic of Angola where he completed military training.

Military career 

He specialized in ground engineering and field artillery. He completed the Brigade Commanders Course at Simferopol Military College in the Crimean Oblast, Soviet Union in 1991. In South Africa, he served as a Company Commander and Operations Officer in the National Peacekeeping Force from January to May 1994 at De Brug and in Koeberg.

He completed the bridging training at the Air Defence Artillery School in Diskobolos. He served as a Battery Commander of Support Battery at the School of Artillery in 1995, Regimental Training Wing Commander in 1999, Officer Commanding School of Artillery during 2002–2004. The then Lt. Col. Makina completed the penultimate single service Senior Command and Staff Duties Course of the SA Army in 2001. He served as the SSO Force Preparation for the  Artillery Formation from 2005 to 2008, SSO Research & Development from 2008 to 2013. Chief of Staff Artillery Formation during 2014 to 2015, he was promoted to the rank of brigadier general on 1 Jan. 2016 and appointed the General Officer Commanding SA Army Artillery Formation. Brig Gen Makina was awarded the master gunner by the senior artilleryman present-Maj Gen Deon Holtzhausen at the crossed-barrels investiture held at the Ubique Hall, School of Artillery on 17 March 2017. He died in Mookgopong on 25 March 2021.

Honours and awards

Medals

Proficiency badges

References 

1964 births
2021 deaths
South African Army generals
South African military officers
People from Port Elizabeth
UMkhonto we Sizwe personnel